STEM Journals is an American educational television program. It was broadcast in 2013–2014 and was hosted by Brad Piccirillo and Geoffrey Notkin. The show dealt with topics in the fields of science, technology, education and mathematics ("STEM"), and introduced scientists, institutions and projects in those fields, such as OSIRIS-REx and the Catalina Sky Survey.

In 2013, "Forces of Flight" won a Rocky Mountain Emmy in the Teen Program/Special category. In 2014, "Action Sports" and "Forensics" won a Rocky Mountain Emmy Award in the Educational-Program Special category.

"Forensics," written and directed by David Routt, won a Silver Telly Award. "Action Sports," written and directed by Frank Kraljic, won a Bronze Telly Award.
STEM Journals is an American educational science television program hosted by Brad Piccirillo and Geoffrey Notkin for children interested in science, technology, engineering, and math (STEM). The program aired on Cox7 for three seasons and won two Telly Awards.

Season 1

Season 2

Season 3

Guests:
Dr.Sian Proctor - explorer, scientist, and STEM communicator. Dr. Sian Proctor was a finalist for the 2009 NASA Astronaut Program. She teaches geology, sustainability, and planetary science at South Mountain Community College.
Prof. Susanne Neuer - oceanographer and associate professor at Arizona State University. 
Dr. Dante Lauretta - Professor of planetary science and cosmochemistry at the University of Arizona’s Lunar and Planetary Laboratory and currently serving as Principal Investigator on NASA’s OSIRIS-REx mission
Dr. Stephen Pratt - is an associate professor at the ASU School of Life Sciences and 
ASU doctoral candidate Job Bobek,

References

Learning programs
2013 American television series debuts
2014 American television series endings